São José is Portuguese for Saint Joseph, and often refers to:

São José dos Campos, Brazil

São José may also refer to:

Brazil

Alagoas
São José da Laje
São José da Tapera

Amapá
São José dos Galibi

Bahia
São José do Jacuípe
São José da Vitória

Espírito Santo
São José do Calçado

Maranhão
São José dos Basílios
São José de Ribamar

Mato Grosso
São José do Povo
São José dos Quatro Marcos
São José do Rio Claro
São José do Xingu

Minas Gerais
São José do Alegre
São José da Barra
São José do Divino, Minas Gerais
São José do Goiabal
São José do Jacuri
São José do Mantimento
São José da Lapa
São José da Safira
São José da Varginha

Paraíba
São José do Bonfim
São José do Brejo do Cruz
São José de Caiana
São José dos Cordeiros
São José de Espinharas
São José da Lagoa Tapada
São José de Piranhas
São José de Princesa
São José dos Ramos
São José do Sabugi

Paraná
São José da Boa Vista
São José das Palmeiras
São José dos Pinhais

Pernambuco
São José do Belmonte
São José da Coroa Grande
São José do Egito

Piauí
São José do Divino, Piauí
São José do Peixe
São José do Piauí

Rio de Janeiro
São José de Ubá
São José do Vale do Rio Preto

Rio Grande do Norte
São José do Campestre
São José de Mipibu
São José do Seridó

Rio Grande do Sul
São José dos Ausentes
São José do Herval
São José do Hortêncio
São José do Inhacorá
São José das Missões
São José do Norte
São José do Ouro

Sao Paulo
São José, Paulínia
São José do Barreiro
São José da Bela Vista
São José do Rio Pardo
São José do Rio Preto

Santa Catarina
São José, Santa Catarina
São José do Cedro
São José do Cerrito

Portugal
São José (Lisbon), a former civil parish in the municipality of Lisbon
São José (Viseu), a civil parish in the municipality of Viseu
São José (Ponta Delgada), a civil parish in the municipality of Ponta Delgada, Azores

Sports
São José Esporte Clube, a Brazilian football club
São José Esporte Clube (women), a Brazilian women's football club
Esporte Clube São José, a Brazilian football club
Sociedade Esportiva e Recreativa São José, a Brazilian football club
São José de Ribamar Esporte Clube, a Brazilian football club
Associação Desportiva e Recreativa São José, a Brazilian football club

Other uses
Convent of São José, Lagoa (Algarve), Portugal, now the city's cultural centre
São José Paquete Africa, a Portuguese slave ship shipwrecked in 1794 near Cape Town, South Africa

See also 
San José (disambiguation)